HMS Oceanway (F143) was a  of the Royal Navy provided under Lend-Lease from the US.

History
The ship was authorised under the United States Lend-Lease act as BAPM-4 ("British Mechanized Artillery Transport 4"), but was reclassified as LSD-12 ("Landing Ship Dock 12") on 1 July 1942. The vessel was originally to have been named HMS Dagger, but the name HMS Oceanway was assigned to it in August 1943. The vessel was formally transferred to the United Kingdom on 29 March 1944.

Oceanway took part in the Normandy Landings, transporting 20 landing craft, arriving at Omaha Beach at 15:30 on 6 June 1944. After the landing the ship was of value transporting damaged landing craft for repair, in one case transporting 17 damaged LCM(3) craft to United Kingdom repair bases. The vessel served in the Far East in 1945 before being returned to the US.

It was loaned to Greece in Match 1947, where it served as Okeanos, before being returned to the United States in 1952. Later that year, it was loaned to France, where it served as Foudre (A646) and was eventually purchased by the French Government, serving in the French Navy until 1969. The ship was sunk as a target in 1970.

References

 
 
 
 

 

Casa Grande-class dock landing ships of the Royal Navy
1943 ships
World War II amphibious warfare vessels of the United Kingdom
Casa Grande-class dock landing ships of the Hellenic Navy
Ships transferred from the United States Navy to the French Navy
Amphibious warfare vessels of the French Navy
Ships sunk as targets
Ships built in Newport News, Virginia
Maritime incidents in 1970